Rygiel may refer to:

Rygiel, Warmian-Masurian Voivodeship, Gmina Kurzętnik, Nowe Miasto County, Warmian-Masurian Voivodeship, Poland

People with the surname
Jim Rygiel (born 1955), Polish-American visual effects supervisor
Marcin Rygiel (born 1983), Polish musician

See also
Rigel

Polish-language surnames